Two vessels of the Royal Navy have been named HMS Marjoram:

 , an  sloop launched on 26 December 1917 and wrecked on 17 January 1921.
 , a  ordered on 8 April 1940 and cancelled on 23 January 1941.

Citations and references

Royal Navy ship names